Yang Sen is a Paralympian athlete from China competing mainly in category T35 sprint events.

He competed in the 2008 Summer Paralympics in Beijing, China.  There he won a gold medal in the men's 100 metres - T35 event

External links
 

Year of birth missing (living people)
Living people
Paralympic athletes of China
Athletes (track and field) at the 2008 Summer Paralympics
Paralympic gold medalists for China
Chinese male sprinters
Medalists at the 2008 Summer Paralympics
Paralympic medalists in athletics (track and field)
Medalists at the 2010 Asian Para Games
Medalists at the World Para Athletics Championships